Four-thousand footers (sometimes abbreviated 4ks) are a group of forty-eight mountains in New Hampshire at least  above sea level. To qualify for inclusion a peak must also meet the more technical criterion of topographic prominence important in the mountaineering sport of peak-bagging.

The White Mountains Four Thousand Footers List is established (and revised from time to time) by the Appalachian Mountain Club. The AMC calls it the White Mountains List, but others call it the New Hampshire List because it does not include Old Speck Mountain (4,170 ft) in Maine, which is outside the White Mountain National Forest but within the White Mountains.  

The AMC also maintains a list of New England 4000 Footers, all falling within Vermont, New Hampshire, and Maine. Other lists of 4000-footers not maintained by the AMC include the original set of 4,000-foot mountains for peak-bagging: the 46 High Peaks in the Adirondacks. 

The AMC has revised its 4000-footer lists as surveying became more accurate or the selection criteria were adjusted, with the White Mountains list growing from 46 peaks in the 1950s to 48 in 1982. The proper inclusion or exclusion of several peaks is still a matter of some dispute.

The 48 lie in the White Mountain National Forest, within two northern counties of New Hampshire: Coos and Grafton. All peaks except those of Mount Washington, Mount Moosilauke and Cannon Mountain are on land owned by the Forest Service, and these three are almost completely surrounded by it.

Prominence
A topographic prominence criterion is applied to exclude high points which are considered subsidiary peaks of a larger mountain. The definition of topographic prominence is the vertical separation between a peak and the low point of the highest ridge connecting it to a higher one. In practical terms, prominence is the minimum distance a hiker must descend before ascending a higher peak.

The AMC's 4000-Footer lists require that a mountain rise  beyond a ridge connecting it to its neighbor.

Four Thousand Footer club
A committee of the Appalachian Mountain Club (AMC) sets the criteria and collects information verifying that peaks meet them. It also maintains a list of the Four Thousand Footer Club's self-declared members, who request recognition for having ascended on foot all of the 48. The first of these was compiled in 1958.

There are numerous variations in completing the Four Thousand Footer list. For example, the AMC maintains a roster of those making ascents between the winter solstice and spring equinox. Another not officially recorded is reaching each summit twelve times, once in each of the twelve months, in any calendar order. This is known as The Grid. , the feat has been claimed by 68 individuals.

The New Hampshire list
New Hampshire Four Thousand Footers are listed below in descending order of their elevations. Some of these names do not appear on maps, and some alternative names are indicated below.

 Washington:	 AT*
 Adams:	 AT**
 Jefferson:	 AT**
 Monroe:	 AT**
 Madison:	 AT*
 Lafayette:	 AT*
 Lincoln:	 AT*
 South Twin:	 AT*
 Carter Dome:	 AT*
 Moosilauke:	 AT*
 Eisenhower:	 AT**
 North Twin:	 
 Carrigain:	 
 Bond:	
 Middle Carter:	 AT*
 West Bond:	
 Garfield:	 AT**
 Liberty:	 AT**
 South Carter:	 AT*
 Wildcat:	 AT*
 Hancock:	
 South Kinsman:	  ("South Peak") AT*
 Field:	 
 Osceola: 	 
 Flume:	
 South Hancock:	
 Pierce:	 AT*
 North Kinsman:	  ("North Peak") AT*
 Willey:	
 Bondcliff:	  ("The Cliffs")
 Zealand:	  ("Zealand Ridge") AT**
 North Tripyramid:	4180 ft ("North Peak")
 Cabot:	
 East Osceola:	  ("East Peak")
 Middle Tripyramid:	
 Cannon:	 
 Wildcat D:	  ("Wildcat Ridge") AT*
 Hale:	
 Jackson:	 AT*
 Tom:	
 Moriah:	 AT**
 Passaconaway:	 
 Owl's Head:	
 Galehead:	 AT**
 Whiteface:	 
 Waumbek:	
 Isolation:	
 Tecumseh: 	Traditionally , resurveyed July 2019 

AT* = Appalachian Trail passes over summit; AT** = AT passes near summit

The New England list
This list consists of the New Hampshire list, plus the following:

4000-Footers in Maine:

Katahdin (Baxter Peak):  AT* (northern terminus)
Katahdin (Hamlin Peak): 
Sugarloaf Mountain:  AT**
Crocker Mountain:  AT*
Old Speck:  AT**
Mount Bigelow (West Peak):	 AT*
North Brother:	
Saddleback Mountain :  AT*
Mount Bigelow (Avery Peak):  AT*
Mount Abraham: 
South Crocker Mountain:	 AT*
Saddleback Mountain (the Horn):	 AT*
Mount Redington:	
Spaulding Mountain:	 AT**

4000-Footers in Vermont:

Mount Mansfield:  LT*
Killington Peak:  AT** LT**
Camel's Hump:   LT*
Mount Ellen:	 LT*
Mount Abraham:	 LT*

LT* = Long Trail passes over summit; LT** = LT passes near summit

See also 

Adirondack High Peaks (Adirondack Forty-sixers)
List of New England Fifty Finest
List of New England Hundred Highest
List of Quebec 1000 meter peaks
Northeast 111 4000-footers

Notes

References 
Smith, Steven; Dickerman, Mike (2001). The 4,000 Footers of the White Mountains.  Littleton: Bondcliff Books.  .
Gene Daniell and Steven D. Smith (editors) (2003). AMC White Mountain Guide, 27th edition. Appalachian Mountain Club Books. .

External links 
The Four Thousand Footer Club (official site)
AMC Four Thousand Footers web page
Interactive Map of the New Hampshire 4000 footers
The White Mountains 4000 Footer Grid
NH 4000 Footers, including weather, trail maps, and current trail conditions

Lists of mountains of the Appalachians
Peak bagging in the United States